Judge Not; or The Woman of Mona Diggings is a 1915 American drama film starring Julia Dean and featuring Harry Carey.

Cast
 Julia Dean as Molly Hanlon
 Harry Carter as Lee Kirk
 Harry Carey as Miles Rand
 Marc Robbins as Judge Rand
 Kingsley Benedict as Clarence Van Dyne
 Joseph Singleton as Minister (as Joe Singleton)
 Paul Machette as Texas Joe
 Lydia Yeamans Titus as Housekeeper
 Walter Belasco as Barkeeper
 Hoot Gibson as Undetermined Role (uncredited)

See also
 Harry Carey filmography
 Hoot Gibson filmography

References

External links

1915 films
1915 drama films
Silent American drama films
American silent feature films
American black-and-white films
Films directed by Robert Z. Leonard
Universal Pictures films
1910s American films